Ning Hao (born 9 September 1977) is a Chinese film director. Ning studied at the Taiyuan Film School, where he majored in scenic design.  He later transferred to the Art Department of Peking University. Ning eventually graduated from the Beijing Film Academy in 2003 with a degree from the Photography Department.

Filmography

Casting
Since his breakout in 2006, Ning frequently re-casts actors who he has worked with, especially Huang Bo and Xu Zheng (as well as himself in cameo roles):

Animal abuse on set 
In March 2018, a video surfaced showing a dog being abused on the set of the Hao-directed movie Crazy Alien. In the video, the dog was shown being spun around in a cage and dumped into cold water. The video was taped by a member of the movie crew. A whistleblower claimed that between shots, the dog was worked into a frenzy so he would bark as loudly as possible, and that this had been done on several takes. The director did not give a statement, but Crazy Alien actor Matthew Morrison said he was heartbroken about the abuse.

Personal life
Ning Hao is married to Xing Aina, who is credited as a screenwriter in all his films since Guns and Roses and No Man's Land. They have a son together.

References

External links 
 
 
 Ning Hao at the Chinese Movie Database

Film directors from Shanxi
People from Taiyuan
Beijing Film Academy alumni
1977 births
Living people
Chinese film directors
Chinese male film actors
Chinese cinematographers
21st-century Chinese male actors
Chinese filmmakers